Ava Canning is an Irish cricketer who plays for Typhoons and Ireland. In May 2021, Canning was named in Ireland's squad to face Scotland, for a four-match Women's Twenty20 International (WT20I) series in Belfast. She made her WT20I debut on 24 May 2021, for Ireland against Scotland. The following month, Canning was offered a non-retainer contract by Cricket Ireland and joined the senior women's performance squad.

References

External links

Year of birth missing (living people)
Living people
Irish women cricketers
Ireland women Twenty20 International cricketers
Place of birth missing (living people)
Typhoons (women's cricket) cricketers
Dragons (women's cricket) cricketers